The  is a railway line in Japan, operated by the East Japan Railway Company (JR East). It connects Fukushima Station through Akita Station to Aomori Station. Since the opening of the Yamagata Shinkansen on July 1, 1992, the Fukushima–Yamagata section (as well as the Yamagata–Shinjō section since 1999) is sometimes referred to as the Yamagata Line. The name of the line as a whole refers to the ancient provinces of Mutsu and Dewa, as it connects both ends of Mutsu by passing north–south through Dewa.

Route data
East Japan Railway Company
Total distance:  (Fukushima–Aomori, Tsuchizaki–Akitakō)
East Japan Railway Company
 (Fukushima–Aomori)
Japan Freight Railway Company
 (Tsuchizaki–Akitakō)
 (Yokote–Aomori)
 (Aomori–Aomori Stoplight Station)
Rail Gauge:

Shinjō–Ōmagari
Akita–Aomori

Fukushima–Yamagata
Uzen-Chitose–Shinjō
Both
Yamagata–Uzen-Chitose
Ōmagari–Akita
Stations: 102 (including freight stations)
Tracks:
Dual-track
Fukushima–Sekine (1968–91)
Akayu–Akayu Stoplight Station (1968)
Uzen-Nakayama–Uzen-Chitose (1968–86)
Ashisawa–Funagata (1975)
Nozoki–Innai (1968)
Ōmagari–Oiwake (1963–94)
Ugo-Iizuka–Hachirōgata (1969)
Kado–Moritake (1967)
Tsurugata–Maeyama (1969–71)
Takanosu–Hayaguchi (1969)
Ōdate–Nagamine (1968–71)
Ishikawa–Kawabe (1967–70)
Single-track
Sekine–Akayu
Akayu Stoplight Station–Uzen-Nakayama
Uzen-Chitose–Ashisawa
Funagata–Nozoki
Innai– Ōmagari
Oiwake–Ugo-Iizuka
Hachirōgata–Kado
Moritake–Tsurugata
Maeyama–Takanosu
Hayaguchi–Ōdate
Nagamine–Ishikawa
Kawabe–Aomori
Electrification: All (alternating current 20,000 V 50 Hz)
Block system: Automatic block system (except Tsuchizaki–Akitakō section (gearing block system))
Depots: Yamagata, Akita

Services
The Ōu Main Line is split into the following four sections. Due to the differences in the tracks of these sections, there are no trains that go through more than one (with the exception of an Akita–Shinjō connection). Local and rapid services on the line are generally operated by 701 series (entire line) and 719 series (Fukushima - Shinjō only) electric multiple unit trains.

Fukushima–Shinjō (148.6 km)
On this section, the Ōu Main Line shares the tracks with the Yamagata Shinkansen. The Ōu Main Line is known as the Yamagata Line on this section.

Shinjō–Ōmagari (98.4 km)
Crossing the Yamagata-Akita border, there is little demand in this section, and all trains except one limited-stop "Rapid" train run as all-stations "Local" trains.

Ōmagari–Akita (51.7 km)
On this section, the Ōu Main Line shares the tracks with the Akita Shinkansen. Because the Ōu Main Line occasionally runs from Akita to Shinjō as a local train, this section contains one standard gauge track and two narrow gauge tracks. Also, the few Komachi trains running on this section have the priority.

Akita–Aomori (185.8 km)

Station list

History
The Japanese national government built the Ōu Main Line, starting construction from Aomori in 1894, from Fukushima in 1899 and linking the two sections in 1905. In 1909 the formal name of the line was declared.

Opening dates for the individual sections are as follows.

Ōu North Line
December 1, 1894: Aomori–Hirosaki
October 21, 1895: Hirosaki–Ikarigaseki
June 21, 1899: Ikarigaseki–Shirasawa
November 15, 1899: Shirasawa–Ōdate
October 7, 1900: Ōdate–Takanosu
November 1, 1901: Takanosu–Noshiro (present-day Higashi–Noshiro)
August 1, 1902: Noshiro–Gojōme (present-day Hachirōgata)
October 21, 1902: Gojōme–Akita
October 1, 1903: Akita–Wada
August 21, 1904: Wada–Jingūji
December 21, 1904: Jingūji–Ōmagari
June 15, 1905: Ōmagari–Yokote

Ōu South Line
May 15, 1899: Fukushima–Yonezawa
April 11, 1901: Yonezawa–Yamagata
August 23, 1901: Yamagata–Tateoka (present-day Murayama)
October 21, 1901: Tateoka–Ōishida
July 21, 1902: Ōishida–Funagata
June 11, 1903: Funagata–Shinjō
October 21, 1904: Shinjō–Innai
July 5, 1905: Innai–Yuzawa
September 14, 1905: Yuzawa–Yokote, completion of Fukushima–Aomori connection

Line upgrading
Various sections of the line have been double-tracked since 1963.

The section between Niwasaka and Akaiwa stations proved to be geologically unstable, with one of the original tunnels collapsing in 1910. A realignment involving two new tunnels was opened a year later. Geological instability was suspected as the cause of a derailment on the section in 1948 that killed three crewmen, and another realignment was undertaken when the section was double-tracked in 1968.

Itaya station was originally a reversing station, and was realigned as a through station in conjunction with the gauge conversion work (see below) in 1990.

Electrification
The Fukushima to Yonezawa section was electrified at 1,500 V DC in 1949, and the Uzen-Chitose–Yamagata section in conjunction with the Senzan Line (also at 1,500 V DC) in 1960. Trials on the Senzan Line subsequently resulted in the adoption of 20 kV AC for all further electrification, and the abovementioned sections were converted to the new standard when the Yonezawa to Yamagata section was electrified in 1968. The Aomori to Akita section was electrified (at 20 kV AC) in 1971, as was the Akita to Uzen-Chitose section in 1975.

Former connecting lines

 Akayu Station: The Yamagata Prefectural Government operated a 2 km 610 mm (2') gauge human powered tramway between 1919 and 1926.
 Oishida Station: The Obabazawa Railway opened a 3 km line to its namesake town in 1916, the line closed in 1970.
 Yuzawa Station: The Ogachi Railway Co. opened a 12 km line to Zentsu, electrified at 600 V DC, between 1928 and 1935. The last 3 km section closed in 1967, the electrification was decommissioned in 1971 and the rest of the line closed in 1973.
 Yokote Station: The Yokote Railway opened a 38 km line to Oikata between 1918 and 1930. Construction commenced on an extension to Maego station on the company's Yuri Kogen Railway Chokai Sanroku Line but was not completed. The 12 km section from Oikata to Niiyama was closed following typhoon damage in 1947, the 7 km section from Niiyama to Tateai closed in 1965 when a bridge was destroyed by floodwaters, and the balance of the line closed in 1971.
 Akita Station: The 762 mm (2'6") gauge Nibetsu Forest Railway, consisting of a 22 km main line and five branches between 1.3 km and 5 km in length (and a 550 m tunnel) operated between 1909 and 1968.
 Hachirogata Station: The Akita Chuo Kotsu operated a 4 km line to Gojome, electrified at 600 V DC, from 1922 until 1969.
 Odate Station: The Kosaka Railway opened a 23 km 762 mm gauge line to its Kosaka Refinery in 1908, together with a 4 km branch from Shigenai to Kizawa the following year. Passenger services ceased on the Kizawa branch in 1926, and it closed in 1951. The 10 km Kosaka to Shigenai section was electrified in 1928, and extended 6 km in 1949, but was decommissioned when the line was converted to 1,067 mm gauge in 1962. Passenger services ended in 1994, and the remaining traffic was sulphuric acid, but following two major derailments the line closed in 2009.

The company also opened a 5 km 762 mm gauge line to the Hanaoka mine in 1914 including a bridge over the Ōu Main Line at Odate, which was converted to 1,067 mm gauge in 1951 to enable ore wagons to be forwarded via JNR trains. Freight services ceased in 1983 and the line closed in 1985.

 Kawabe Station: The 7 km line to Kuroishi was opened in 1912, transferred to the Konan Railway in 1984, the year that freight services ceased, and closed in 1998.

Gauge conversion
Full standard Shinkansen lines are constructed using 1,435 mm gauge track on a separate alignment, with a high speed and a commensurately high construction cost. Following privatisation and regionalisation of the JNR network in 1987, the JR East company decided to convert the Fukushima–Yamagata section of the 1,067 mm gauge Ōu Main line to 1,435 mm gauge, enabling Shinkansen trains from Yamagata to travel on the Tohoku Shinkansen line through to Tokyo. Called Mini-shinkansen, this was a cost-effective way of providing an improved level of service on the line, although only purpose-built Shinkansen trains can travel on such lines, as the loading gauge was not changed, nor the voltage (full standard Shinkansen lines use 25 kV AC).

The success of this project led to the conversion of the Omagari to Akita section in conjunction with the opening of the Akita Shinkansen in 1997, and the extension of the Yamagata Shinkansen to Shinjo in 1999. These projects also created parallel 1,435 and 1,067 mm gauge lines between Omagari and Akita and between Yamagata and Uzen-Chitose respectively, and a dual-gauge section between Jinguji and Minejoshikawa (on the Omagari to Akita section), enabling Shinkansen trains to pass at speed on the mostly single-track line.

Additionally, local services continue to be provided on the gauge-converted lines by 701-5000 series standard-gauge suburban/interurban rolling stock.

Notes

References

External links
 Stations of Ōu Main Line Line (JR East) 

 
Lines of East Japan Railway Company
1067 mm gauge railways in Japan
Standard gauge railways in Japan
Dual gauge railways